Il casinista is a 1980 Italian comedy film directed by Pier Francesco Pingitore. It stars Pippo Franco, Renzo Montagnani, Bombolo, and Simona Mariani.

References

External links
 

1980 films
Italian comedy films
1980 comedy films
1980s Italian films